David Alan Samuels (October 9, 1948 – April 22, 2019) was an American vibraphone and marimba player who spent many years with the contemporary jazz group Spyro Gyra. His recordings and live performances during that period also reflect his prowess on the steelpan, a tuned percussion instrument of Trinidadian origin.

Biography
Samuels was born in Waukegan, Illinois, United States. At the age of six he started playing drums and piano. He learned vibes and marimba while a student at Boston University. He continued his studies at the Berklee College of Music, also in Boston, and studied with vibraphonist Gary Burton. He taught percussion at Berklee before moving to New York City in 1974. Soon he was recording and performing with Gerry Mulligan, Carla Bley, and Gerry Niewood. He played in a vibes/marimba duo with David Friedman, who had been his teacher at Boston, releasing albums under the name Double Image.

In 1979 he began recording with Spyro Gyra, eventually becoming a member of the band in 1986 and remaining with it through the 1990s. During the 1980s he also recorded with Paul McCandless, Art Lande, Anthony Davis, and Bobby McFerrin. In 1993 he created the Caribbean Jazz Project.

Samuels wrote columns for the magazines Modern Percussionist and Modern Drummer, a method book, and made an instructional video. He taught at Berklee and at the New England Conservatory of Music.

Samuels died on April 22, 2019, due to an undisclosed long-term illness.

Discography
 1980 One Step Ahead (Dire Silverline)
 1988 Living Colors (MCA)
 1989 Ten Degrees North (MCA)
 1989 Fountainhead with Andy LaVerne (SteepleChase)
 1991 Natural Selection (GRP)
 1992 Del Sol (GRP)
 1994 Synergy with Samuels (Tall Poppies)
 1998 Tjader-ized: A Cal Tjader Tribute (Verve/Polygram)
 2006 Mosaic (Concord)
 2007 Dualism

With Spyro Gyra
 1978 Spyro Gyra
 1979 Morning Dance
 1980 Catching the Sun
 1980 Carnaval
 1981 Freetime
 1982 Incognito
 1983 City Kids
 1984 Access All Areas
 1985 Alternating Currents
 1986 Breakout
 1987 Stories Without Words
 1988 Rites of Summer
 1989 Point of View
 1990 Fast Forward
 1992 Three Wishes
 1993 Dreams Beyond Control
 1995 Love and Other Obsessions
 1996 Heart of the Night
 1997 20/20
 1999 Got the Magic
 2003 Original Cinema
 2004 The Deep End
 2006 Wrapped in a Dream
 2008 A Night Before Christmas

With Caribbean Jazz Project
 1995 The Caribbean Jazz Project
 1997 Island Stories
 2000 New Horizons
 2001 Paraiso
 2002 The Gathering
 2003 Birds of a Feather
 2005 Diane Schuur Featuring Caribbean Jazz Project – Schuur Fire
 2005 Here and Now: Live in Concert
 2006 Mosaic
 2008 Afro Bop Alliance

With Double Image
 1977 Double Image
 1979 Dawn
 1986 In Lands I Never Saw
 1994 Open Hand (live)
 1997 Duotones
 2006 Moment to Moment (Live in Concert)

As sideman
With Gerry Mulligan
 1974 Carnegie Hall Concert  (CTI), Chet Baker, Gerry Mulligan
 1976 Idol Gossip
 1995 Dragonfly

With others
 1977 Gerry Niewood and Timepiece, Gerry Niewood & Timepiece
 1978 Dawn, David Friedman
 1978 Zappa in New York, Frank Zappa
 1979 All the Mornings Bring, Paul McCandless
 1981 Gallery, Gallery
 1981 The Navigator, Paul McCandless
 1981 Skylight, Art Lande
 1983 Hemispheres, Anthony Davis
 1986 Storytime, T Lavitz
 1991 Cool Running, Jeremy Wall
 1991 You Can't Do That on Stage Anymore, Vol. 4, Frank Zappa
 1992 Red Sun, Dave Valentin
 1992 Stepping to the New World, Jeremy Wall
 1993 A Night in Englewood, Paquito D'Rivera & the United Nation Orchestra
 1993 Arc, Jimmy Haslip
 1994 Picture Perfect Morning, Edie Brickell
 1994 Two Hearts, Peter Kater
 1994 We Live Here, Pat Metheny
 1994 World Tour, Jason Miles
 1997 Playin' Hooky, Bob James
 2002 Speaking of Now, Pat Metheny

References

External links

1948 births
2019 deaths
People from Waukegan, Illinois
Boston University alumni
Musicians from Illinois
Writers from Illinois
American percussionists
Latin Grammy Award winners
Latin jazz musicians
Caribbean Jazz Project members
Spyro Gyra members